Ogun State Television also known by its acronym OGTV is a Nigerian satellite television station owned by the Ogun State Government.
It was established on December 25, 1981 as a public corporation.

Comrade Tunde Oladunjoye is the Board Chairman of the station.

See also
Ogun State Broadcasting Corporation

References

Television stations in Nigeria
Television channels and stations established in 1981
Public broadcasting in Nigeria